Robert Ian (Bob) Tricker is an expert in corporate governance who wrote the first book to use the title corporate governance in 1984, based on his research at Nuffield College, Oxford. He was also the founder-editor of the research journal Corporate Governance - an international review (1993).

Tricker was the founder-editor of Corporate Governance: An International Review and holds honorary professorships at The University of Hong Kong, where he served as Professor of Finance in the Business School from 1986 to 1996, the Open University of Hong Kong and the Hong Kong Baptist University.

Biography 
I have always regarded Bob Tricker as the Father of Corporate Governance since his 1984 book introduced me to the words corporate governance. — Sir Adrian Cadbury, author of the first corporate governance code (UK, 1992)

Tricker left King Henry VIII Grammar School in Coventry at 16, and qualified as a chartered accountant at 21. He served as an officer in the Royal Navy, and later as financial controller of a manufacturing company. After studying at the Harvard Business School and Oxford University(P.D. Leake Research Fellow 1966/67), Tricker became the first professor of management information systems at the University of Warwick (1967–1970).  He then returned to Oxford as Director of the Oxford Centre for Management Studies (1971–79) and to a Research Fellowship at Nuffield College, Oxford (1979–1984), where he undertook the research that led to Corporate Governance (1984).

Tricker was awarded a doctorate (D.Litt.) by the UK Council for National Academic Awards, and has served on the Councils of both the Institute of Chartered Accountants in England and Wales and the Institute of Chartered Management Accountants. In 1984 he set up the Hong Kong Management Development Centre, and was appointed Professor of Finance at the University of Hong Kong, a post he held until 1996.

Currently he is a member of the editorial board of Corporate Governance – an international Review, one of the judges in the annual Hong Kong Institute of CPA’s Best Corporate Governance Disclosure Awards competition, and holds honorary or adjunct professorships of three universities. He is an emeritus associate of Aon - Regional Corporate Governance Practice based in Hong Kong.

Bibliography 
The Accountant in Management (Batsford, 1967) 
Management Information and Control Systems (Wiley, 1976) 
The Independent Director (Tolley, 1978) 
Effective Information Management (Beaumont Executive Press, 1982; Van Nostrand Reinhold, 1984)
Corporate Governance (Gower Press, 1984) 
International Corporate Governance: Text, Cases and Readings (Prentice Hall, 1995) 
Corporate Governance (editor), in the History of Thought in Management series (Ashgate, 2000) 
Directors: An A-Z Guide (Economist a-Z Guide) (Economist Books, 2009) 
Corporate Governance - principles, policies and practices (Oxford University Press, 2009) 
(with Gretchen Tricker) Business Ethics: A stakeholder, governance and risk approach (Routledge, 2014) 
Oxford Circus: The Story of Oxford University and Management Education (2015) 
(with Gregg Li) Understanding Corporate Governance in China (Hong Kong University Press, 2019) 
The Evolution of Corporate Governance (Cambridge University Press, 2020)

Official reports 
Research in Accountancy - a strategy for further work, Social Science Research Council, London 1975  
Inquiry into the Prescription Pricing Authority, for the Minister of Health, HMSO, London 1977
Governing the Institute; a study on the governance of the Institute of Chartered Accountants in England & Wales, ICAEW, 1983
The Company Secretary in Hong Kong’s Listed Companies, Hong Kong Institute of Company Secretaries, 1995 (with Jessica Leung and Kelly Lee)
Good Practice in corporate governance – a research paper for the United Nations Development Program, Republic of Korea, 1998

References

External links

Tricker’s blog

Living people
Fellows of Nuffield College, Oxford
Year of birth missing (living people)